The Mislow–Evans rearrangement is a name reaction in organic chemistry. It is named after Kurt Mislow who reported the prototypical reaction in 1966, and David A. Evans who published further developments. The reaction allows the formation of allylic alcohols from allylic sulfoxides in a 2,3-sigmatropic rearrangement.

General reaction scheme 
The reaction is a powerful way to create particular stereoisomers of the alcohol since it is highly diastereoselective and the chirality at the sulphur atom can be transmitted to the carbon next to the oxygen in the product.

The sulfoxide 1 reagent can be generated easily and enantioselectively from the corresponding sulfide by an oxidation reaction. In this reaction various organic groups can be used, R1 = alkyl, allyl and R2 = alkyl, aryl or benzyl

Mechanism 
A proposed mechanism is shown below:

The mechanism starts with an allylic sulfoxide 1 which undergoes a thermal 2,3-sigmatropic rearrangement to give a sulfenate ester 2. This can be cleaved using a thiophile, such as phosphite ester, which leaves the allylic alcohol 3 as the product.

Scope 
The reaction has general application in the preparation of trans-allylic alcohols. Douglass Taber used the Mislow–Evans rearrangement in the synthesis of the hormone prostaglandin E2.

References 

Rearrangement reactions
Name reactions